Galashino is a rural locality (a village) in Klyapovskoye Rural Settlement, Beryozovsky District, Perm Krai, Russia. The population was 13 as of 2010.

Geography 
Galashino is located 14 km east of  Beryozovka (the district's administrative centre) by road. Kostyata is the nearest rural locality.

References 

Rural localities in Beryozovsky District, Perm Krai